The Roland MC-505 is a groovebox conceived in 1998 as a combination of a MIDI controller, a music sequencer, a drum machine, and a desktop synthesizer with many synthesis features: arpeggiator, oscillators, and voltage-controlled filter, control of attack, decay, sustain and release, different envelopes and 2 Lfo. It was released as the successor to the Roland MC-303 and is a compact version of the Roland JX-305 Groovesynth without the full set of 61 keys. It is also the predecessor to the Roland D2, Roland MC-307, Roland MC-909 and the Roland MC-808.

Features

The key features of the MC-505 are:

 64 voice polyphonic digital subtractive synthesis engine (derived from the Roland JV-1080) with 251 different oscillator, acoustic and drum sample waveforms 
 512 built-in preset sounds, 256 user sounds & 26 rhythm sets (includes the Roland CR-78, TR-808, TR-606, TR-909, TR-707 and R-8)
 8-track MIDI sequencer + Mute Ctrl Track
 Recording length of up to 32 bars per pattern
 714 preset sequencer patterns, 200 user patterns, 50 user songs
 3 multi-effect units: Reverb, Delay and 24 different EFXs
 Infrared D-Beam controller for hands-free sound modulation
 MEGAMix function for intuitive realtime mixing of beats and patterns
 5 volt Smartmedia card slot for doubling user patch and pattern memory

Notable artists
 Beck
 Chicks on Speed
 Cibo Matto
 Duo 505
 Eric Prydz 
 Freddy Fresh
 Gustavo Cerati
 James McNally (Afro Celts)
 Kirlian Camera
 Lasgo
 The Legendary Pink Dots
 M.I.A.
 New Order
 Peaches
 Radiohead
 Rambo Amadeus
 Skinny Puppy
 Sean Lennon
 Grace Ives
 Juan Atkins
 I-F
 The Prodigy

References

External links
MC-505 PDF Manual Links:
 Online Roland MC-505 PDF Owners Manual Location
 Roland MC-505 Service Notes Manual Schematics

Other Links:
 Roland US Corporation, MC-505 site and files.
 Roland MC-505's discussion Group Forum, at Yahoo! Groups
 Roland MC-505 FAQ v.1.041
 Sound on Sound review
 "Roland MC505 - next up from the mc303 comes the 505 - same thing, more power". - (Dancetech.com "A London, UK Independent Product Reviews site". - Date: March 16, 2000)
 At Home With the Groovebox - Compilation of artists using only the MC-505 featuring Beck, Air, Sonic Youth, Pavement, Jean Jacques Perrey, Gershon Kingsley, Cibo Matto, Sean Lennon and others. Released in 2000 by Grand Royal.

MC-505
Grooveboxes